The 1985–86 daytime network television schedule for the three major English-language commercial broadcast networks in the United States covers the weekday and weekend daytime hours from September 1985 to August 1986.

Legend

 New series are highlighted in bold.

Schedule
 All times correspond to U.S. Eastern and Pacific Time scheduling (except for some live sports or events). Except where affiliates slot certain programs outside their network-dictated timeslots, subtract one hour for Central, Mountain, Alaska, and Hawaii-Aleutian times.
 Local schedules may differ, as affiliates have the option to pre-empt or delay network programs. Such scheduling may be limited to preemptions caused by local or national breaking news or weather coverage (which may force stations to tape delay certain programs to other timeslots) and any major sports events scheduled to air in a weekday timeslot (mainly during major holidays). Stations may air shows at other times at their preference.

Monday–Friday

CBS note: CBS returned the 4:00 p.m. time slot to the affiliates beginning September 29, 1986, after Press Your Luck finished its run three days earlier, making CBS the last of the Big Three to return the time slot to affiliates. Many CBS affiliates did not air network programming in the 4:00 p.m. time slot, opting to air local and/or syndicated programming instead.

Saturday

In the News aired at the end of CBS' Saturday morning shows except Muppet Babies and CBS Storybreak; CBS would also move the Pacific Time Zone schedule feed for its Saturday Morning lineup from its 8 AM-2 PM (Eastern Time) pattern to the 7 AM-1 PM (Central Time) pattern. Also, the shows past 1PM were removed in January.

One to Grow On aired after the credits of NBC's Saturday morning shows except Punky Brewster and Mister T.

Sunday

By network

ABC

Returning series
ABC Funfit
ABC Weekend Special
ABC World News This Morning
ABC World News Tonight with Peter Jennings
All My Children
All-Star Blitz
American Bandstand
The Bugs Bunny/Looney Tunes Comedy Hour
General Hospital
Good Morning America
Laff-A-Lympics 
The Littles
Loving
One Life to Live
Pink Panther and Sons  (moved from NBC)
Ryan's Hope
This Week with David Brinkley

New series
The 13 Ghosts of Scooby-Doo
Bruce Forsyth's Hot Streak
Ewoks
Fame, Fortune and Romance
Lifestyles of the Rich and Famous
New Love, American Style
Scooby's Mystery Funhouse
Star Wars: Droids
The Super Powers Team: Galactic Guardians
Three's a Crowd 

Not returning from 1984-85
Angie 
Celebrity Family Feud
Dragon's Lair
The Edge of Night
Family Feud 
Mighty Orbots
The New Scooby-Doo Mysteries
The Puppy's Great Adventures
Rubik the Amazing Cube 
Scary Scooby Funnies
Schoolhouse Rock!
Superfriends: The Legendary Super Powers Show
Trivia Trap
Turbo Teen
Wolf Rock TV

CBS

Returning series
The $25,000 Pyramid
As the World Turns
Body Language
Capitol
CBS Evening News
CBS Morning News
CBS News Sunday Morning
CBS Storybreak
The Charlie Brown and Snoopy Show
Dungeons & Dragons
Face the Nation
The Get Along Gang 
Guiding Light
Jim Henson's Muppet Babies
Land of the Lost 
Pole Position 
Press Your Luck
The Price Is Right
Richie Rich 
The Young and the Restless

New Series
The Berenstain Bears
Card Sharks
Hulk Hogan's Rock 'n' Wrestling
Little Muppet Monsters
The Wuzzles

Not Returning From 1984-85
The Biskitts 
The Bugs Bunny/Road Runner Show
Captain Kangaroo
Pryor's Place
Saturday Supercade
Shirt Tales

NBC

Returning Series
Alvin and the Chipmunks
Another World
Days of Our Lives
Kidd Video
Meet the Press
Mister T
NBC News at Sunrise
NBC Nightly News
Sale of the Century
Santa Barbara
Scrabble
Search for Tomorrow
The Smurfs
Snorks
Spider-Man and His Amazing Friends 
Super Password
Today
Wheel of Fortune

New Series
Disney's Adventures of the Gummi Bears
Family Ties 
It's Punky Brewster
Your Number's Up

Not Returning From 1984-85
The Facts of Life 
Going Bananas
The Incredible Hulk 
Pink Panther and Sons (moved to ABC)
Silver Spoons 
Time Machine

See also
1985-86 United States network television schedule (prime-time)
1985-86 United States network television schedule (late night)

Sources
https://web.archive.org/web/20071015122215/http://curtalliaume.com/abc_day.html
https://web.archive.org/web/20071015122235/http://curtalliaume.com/cbs_day.html
https://web.archive.org/web/20071012211242/http://curtalliaume.com/nbc_day.html

United States weekday network television schedules
1985 in American television
1986 in American television